The 11th Goya Awards were presented in Palacio Municipal de Congresos de Madrid on 25 January 1997.

Thesis won the award for Best Film.

Winners and nominees

Major award nominees

Other award nominees

Honorary Goya
 Miguel Picazo

References

External links
Official website (Spanish)

11
1996 film awards
1996 in Spanish cinema